Warren Booth Burrows (September 14, 1877 – December 8, 1952) was a United States district judge of the United States District Court for the District of Connecticut and the 8th Attorney General of Connecticut.

Education and career

Born in Poquonock Bridge, Connecticut, Burrows received a Bachelor of Laws from University of Michigan Law School in 1904. He was in private practice of law in New London, Connecticut from 1905 to 1906. He was an assistant state's attorney of New London from 1906 to 1916. He was state's attorney of New London from 1917 to 1927. He was a member of the Connecticut House of Representatives from 1925 to 1927 and the Connecticut Senate from 1927 to 1928.

Federal judicial service

Burrows was nominated by President Calvin Coolidge on February 3, 1928, to the United States District Court for the District of Connecticut, to a new seat authorized by 44 Stat. 1348. He was confirmed by the United States Senate on February 16, 1928, and received his commission the same day. His service terminated on October 20, 1930, due to his resignation.

Later career and death

Following his resignation from the federal bench, Burrows served as the 8th Attorney General of Connecticut from 1931 to 1935. He died in Poquonock Bridge on December 8, 1952.

References

Sources
 

1877 births
1952 deaths
Judges of the United States District Court for the District of Connecticut
United States district court judges appointed by Calvin Coolidge
20th-century American judges
University of Michigan Law School alumni
Members of the Connecticut House of Representatives
Connecticut state senators
Connecticut Attorneys General